Epsilon Coronae Australis (ε CrA), is a star system located in the constellation Corona Australis. Varying in brightness between apparent magnitudes of 4.74 to 5 over 14 hours, it is the brightest W Ursae Majoris variable (low mass contact binary) in the night sky.

Naming
Nicolas Louis de Lacaille gave Epsilon Coronae Australis its Bayer designation. It is also known as HR 7152, and HD 175813.

Properties
Epsilon Coronae Australis is an F4V dwarf star with an effective temperature of 6000 Kelvin. It ranges between apparent magnitudes of 4.74 to 5 over 14 hours, an absolute magnitude of +2.45, and a mass of 1.1 solar masses. Epsilon Coronae Australis is a W Ursae Majoris variable, indicating that it has a contact companion within the Roche limit of the primary. The star is located at a distance of 30 pc (97 light years) from the Sun. Yildiz and colleagues estimated the age of the system at 2.83 ± 0.28 billion years based on study of the properties of the system and estimated rate of mass transfer. They found the current masses of the primary and secondary to be  1.72 ± 0.04 and 0.22 ± 0.02 solar masses respectively, from their original masses of  1.06 ± 0.03 and 2.18 ± 0.06 solar masses.

Notes

References 

Corona Australis
Corona Australis, Epsilon
Corona Australis, Epsilon
W Ursae Majoris variables
Durchmusterung objects
7152
175813
093174